Vaala is a municipality in Finland. It is located in the North Ostrobothnia  region. Previously Vaala was part of the Kainuu region but was transferred to Northern Ostrobothnia on 1 January 2016.

Oulujärvi, the fourth largest lake of Finland is located partly in Vaala.

The municipality is unilingually Finnish.

Vaala is also an old Finnish word, which means the phase in a river just before rapids.

History 
The original center of the area was Manamansalo, the largest island in the Oulujärvi with a village by the same name. Both it and Säräisniemi were first mentioned in 1555 when they were parts of the large Liminka parish. The parish of Oulujärvi, covering all of Kainuu with its center in Manamansalo, was separated from Liminka in 1559, but merged back into Liminka in the 1580s after Russians raided the island. In 1599, the area became a parish again, this time with its center in Paltaniemi, due to which the parish was now known as Paltamo.

Säräisniemi acquired its own church under Paltamo in 1779 and became a separate parish and municipality in 1864. Vuolijoki was separated from Säräisniemi as a parish in 1896 and as a municipality in 1915. Some parts of Kajaanin maalaiskunta were also used in the municipality's formation. The village of Vaala was transferred from Utajärvi to Säräisniemi in 1954, becoming the new administrative center of the municipality. The municipality itself was also renamed Vaala in the process.

Vaala was transferred from Kainuu to North Ostrobothnia in 2016.

Dialect 

Vaala is located on the border between the Northern Ostrobothnian and Savonian (Kainuu) dialects.

Notable people
 Anne Huotari (born 1959)
 Tytti Seppänen (born 1980)

See also
 Vaala Airfield
 Finnish national road 22

References

External links 
 
 Municipality of Vaala – Official website

 
Populated places established in 1954
1954 establishments in Finland
Populated lakeshore places in Finland